The Philippine House Committee on Sustainable Development Goals, or House Sustainable Development Goals Committee is a standing committee of the Philippine House of Representatives.

Originally designated as a special committee, it was elevated into a standing committee on March 10, 2020.

Jurisdiction 
As prescribed by House Rules, the committee's jurisdiction is on the achievement of the country's commitment of the United Nations (UN) 2030 Agenda for Sustainable Development which includes, but not limited to the following:
 Achieving gender equality and empowering women
 Ensuring access to affordable and clean energy
 Ensuring access to waters
 Eradicating extreme poverty and hunger
 Obtaining quality education
 Promoting health and well-being
 Promoting inclusive & sustainable economic growth and decent work
 Sanitation for all

Members, 18th Congress

See also 
 House of Representatives of the Philippines
 List of Philippine House of Representatives committees

References

External links 
House of Representatives of the Philippines

Sustainable Development Goals
Sustainable Development Goals